Elgonina refulgens is a species of tephritid or fruit flies in the genus Elgonina of the family Tephritidae.

Distribution
The Elgonina refulgens is found in Kenya, Africa.

References

Tephritinae
Insects described in 1957
Diptera of Africa